The 2001–02 Liga Leumit season saw Hapoel Kfar Saba and Bnei Yehuda promoted to the Israeli Premier League. Hapoel Beit She'an were relegated to Liga Artzit alongside Hakoah Ramat Gan, who, despite finishing seventh, were demoted due to their financial problems, reprieving 11th-placed Tzafririm Holon. Lior Asulin of Maccabi Herzliya was the league's top scorer with 28 goals.

Final table

References

External links
Israel Second Level 2001/02 RSSSF

Liga Leumit seasons
Israel
2001–02 in Israeli football leagues